Founded in 2006, the Liga Atlântica de Basebol (Atlantic Baseball League) (LAB) is an active baseball league that operates in the cities of Aveiro, Coimbra, Esposende, Gondomar, Maia, Porto and Vila do Conde. It is the most prolific, organized, and structured baseball league in Portugal currently, and functions as close to professional league baseball as is possible in the country today.

The LAB consists of seven active baseball teams.

Esposende Raptors
Villas Vikings
Porto Buffalos Baseball Club
Inter Baseball da Maia (Formerly “Lycans”)
Gondomar-Paredes Highlanders
University of Aveiro
Academica Coimbra

The League’s 24-game regular season runs from April to July (pre-season in February and March), and a playoff between the top four teams at the end of the regular season. The league also holds an All Star Game at the end of the regular season, with players being voted in by fans. The All Star game day also features a Home Run Derby for selected LAB players.

LAB Champions:

 2011 – Aveiro
 2012 – Lycans
 2013 – Aveiro
 2014 - Inter Baseball
 2015 - Aveiro

See also

References

External links 
 Official Site of the Portuguese Baseball Federation

Baseball in Portugal
Baseball leagues in Europe
Sports leagues established in 2006
Professional sports leagues in Portugal